is a Japanese animated television series inspired by the works of Jules Verne, particularly Twenty Thousand Leagues Under the Sea and the exploits of Captain Nemo. The series was created by NHK, Toho and Korad, from a concept of Hayao Miyazaki, and directed by Hideaki Anno of Gainax. The opening song is "Blue Water" by Miho Morikawa and the ending song is "Yes I Will" by Miho Morikawa.

Nadia follows a young inventor named Jean and a former circus performer named Nadia, who wishes to return to her home in Africa.

In its original Japanese broadcast, it aired from 1990 to 1991 and ran for 39 episodes, and was distributed by ADV Films in the United States. ADV's Anime Network has broadcast the series in the United States. Following the 2009 closure of ADV, Sentai Filmworks re-licensed the anime series, which was re-released on Blu-ray and DVD in March 2014.

Episode list

References

Lists of anime episodes